Flitter may refer to:
 
Flitter, character in My Little Pony
A number of butterflies:
Golden tree flitter Quedara basiflava 
Tree flitter Hyarotis adrastus
Brush flitter Hyarotis microstrictum
Dubious flitter Quedara monteithi of genus Quedara

See also
Flit (disambiguation)
Flit gun, an insecticide sprayer
Flittermouse, the bat
Flitter Milz, a U.S. law firm